The Das Balsas River is a river of Bahia state in eastern Brazil, a tributary of the Rio de Janeiro (Bahia).

See also
List of rivers of Bahia

References
Brazilian Ministry of Transport

Rivers of Bahia